The Canon EOS 3000N (EOS 66 in Asia and Rebel XS N in North America) is a 35mm auto-focus single lens reflex (SLR) camera that was introduced in February 2002 as a replacement for the EOS 3000.

The camera has a QD date model that prints the date and time of the photograph onto the image.

References

Cameras introduced in 2002
Canon EOS 35 mm cameras